The Chapayevka is a river in Samara Oblast, Russia, a left tributary of the Volga. It origins at the slope of Siny Syrt and flows to the Saratov Reservoir, near Novokuybyshevsk, Samara agglomeration. It is 298 km long and its drainage basin is 4,310 km². The town of Chapayevsk lies along the river. The river is navigable for 34 km, from its mouth to Chapayevsk. The river has snow feeding and dries up in the upper stream. Since November till April it is used to be frozen. Major inflows are Petrushka, Vetlyanka, Vyazovka.

The river originally was named Mocha. In 1925 it was renamed Chapayevka in honor of the Russian Civil War Red Army combatant Vasily Chapayev.

References 

Rivers of Samara Oblast